Sir William Hollingworth Quayle Jones was chief justice of Sierra Leone as well as acting governor of the colony. He was knighted in 1892.

References 

Knights Bachelor
Year of birth missing
Year of death missing
Sierra Leone Colony and Protectorate judges